Mercy Graves is a supervillain appearing in multimedia and American comic books published by DC Entertainment and DC Comics. Created for the DC Animated Universe (DCAU), she first appeared in 1996 on Superman: The Animated Series as the personal assistant and bodyguard of Superman’s archenemy Lex Luthor, returning in Justice League and Justice League Unlimited, voiced by Lisa Edelstein.  She has since been introduced into comic books published by DC Comics.

In live action, the character has been played by Tao Okamoto in the 2016 DC Extended Universe (DCEU) film Batman v Superman: Dawn of Justice, by Cassidy Freeman in Smallville (as Tess Mercer), by Rhona Mitra in the fourth season of the television series Supergirl, and by Natalie Gumede in the second season of the Titans DC Universe series.

DC Animated Universe

Superman: The Animated Series

Mercy Graves was created for Superman: The Animated Series as a tough young woman with a checkered past, serving as Lex Luthor's personal bodyguard and chauffeur. Originally the leader of a gang of female thieves, Mercy once daringly swiped Luthor's briefcase from under the billionaire's nose. She did not get far before Luthor's men hunted her down. However, rather than take revenge, Luthor, impressed by her mixture of ruthlessness and street savvy, offered her a job. He took her in, cleaned her up, and made her his right-hand woman. Trained in unarmed combat, she was entrusted with his personal security and also to carry out his dirty work.

Her demeanor reveals a sardonic wit and her habitual dress is a chauffeur's uniform with a very short skirt, a chauffeur's cap, nylons, and short, high heeled boots. Mercy is loyal and respectful to Luthor, and she claims to be "the only one in Luthor's entire company who can get away with calling him Lex".

In the episode "Brave New Metropolis" Lois Lane travels to an alternate reality of Metropolis. Mercy Graves is the commander of Lex Luthor's law-enforcement group. She and her soldiers raid the hideout of the revolutionaries led by Jimmy Olsen where they arrest the revolutionaries, confiscate the stolen Kryptonite, send the adults to prison, and send any children of the revolutionaries to the LexCorp Orphanage. When she hears Jimmy call out to Lois, Mercy had her brought before Lex Luthor after the DNA tests prove that she is Lois Lane. Lex Luthor decided that to keep Superman at bay, it would be best to dispose of Lois. He sent Mercy to kill her in the city. On their way, they came across Angela Chen, who managed to distract the commander. Lois stole Mercy's gun and before she could react, Angela had bitten her leg. Lois made her getaway. Lois and the alternate Superman met where he learned what Lex Luthor has been doing behind his back. In the LexCorp building, Mercy was present when Lois and Superman confronted Luthor. Mercy fought Lois, but ultimately lost when Lois planted a jaw-breaking left hook. Rebels stormed into the room and poured onto the hated Mercy while Superman pursued Lex Luthor.

In the episode "Ghost in the Machine", Mercy teams up with Superman to find a missing Lex Luthor. Superman tries to convince Mercy that Luthor does not actually care for her, but Mercy tries to prove him wrong. After a battle with Brainiac, Mercy is pinned under a pile of fallen machinery while the room was effected by a strong vacuum. Although Luthor could have saved her, he flees instead causing Superman to save her.

During the "World's Finest" crossover arc, Mercy develops an intense rivalry with Harley Quinn, the Joker's henchwoman and on again/off again girlfriend as Joker himself forms a tenuous alliance with her boss to kill Superman. During the arc's climactic episode, Harley and Joker gag her and Lex and tie them to a killer android that attacks Batman and Superman. She and Lex are saved by the two, and is later seen watching television and laughing to herself as Harley is publicly arrested.

Justice League
Mercy Graves later reappears in the Justice League episode "Tabula Rasa". The nature of her relationship with Luthor becomes more clear. Mercy has agreed to take over LexCorp while Luthor is in prison and is hesitant to return it to him because she feels their former relationship was not an equal one. She also states that while she was the CEO of LexCorp, she brought the stock up 38% and removed certain departments in the science division finding them useless or to save money. Lex Luthor exacerbates the situation by verbally and physically abusing her. It is repeatedly implied that their relationship was not solely platonic. Mercy grudgingly assists Luthor's escape from the Justice League, but his deceitful manipulation of another devoted servant causes Mercy to see their years together in a different light. After his capture, Mercy hangs up on Lex Luthor during his single phone call when he requests help in obtaining a lawyer and doctors to treat his Kryptonite-caused cancer.

Justice League Unlimited
Mercy Graves reappears in the Justice League Unlimited episode "Clash". She was seen at Lex Luthor's side again.

Comics 
Mercy Graves first appeared in the main DC Universe continuity in Detective Comics #735 (August 1999), during the No Man's Land storyline in the Batman titles. This version of Mercy has blonde hair and does not wear a chauffeur's uniform. She is sometimes seen wearing a suit and tie. She is later joined by another female bodyguard in Luthor's employ, Hope. It is suggested that the two may be Amazons, as they have exchanged blows with Superman. This possibility is referenced in the President Luthor: Secret Files and Origins comic when the sorceress Circe appears at the White House demanding to meet with Lex. Hope and Mercy inform Circe that they can always recognize her, no matter what disguise or form she might take, suggesting some previous familiarity. After temporarily changing them into birds Circe tells Lex that he will need to hire new Amazon bodyguards.

Although Hope's time as a LexCorp employee has passed, Mercy can be seen with the fugitive Lex Luthor after he is driven from the Presidency. Despite her loyalty to Luthor, she has still shown some humanity even while in his employ; when Superman was searching for Lois Lane after she was abducted and impersonated by the Parasite, Mercy saw him during his search, and, in that moment, saw him not as an alien, but as a man who had lost everything. A Mercy-Harley Quinn fight is featured in Action Comics #765 (May 2000).

In the series 52, Mercy is seen alongside Luthor at the unveiling of his "Be Your Own Hero" program, and is injured when she fires several gunshots at Steel, which he deflects and sends back at her, hitting her in the right hand. She is later shown in Luthor's employ in 52 Week 40.

Mercy has appeared in the Infinity, Inc. series, apparently wanting to atone for her past deeds. In #8, she takes on the moniker "Vanilla" and wears a costume equipped with a special mask that will keep her identity hidden from the likes of Superman and Lex Luthor. In #10, she almost beats a man to death. She leaves the team soon after, accepting the fact that she is not "hero" material.

Mercy's Amazon heritage is confirmed in Justice League: Cry for Justice, when the supervillain Prometheus nearly kills Supergirl with god-forged bullets he claimed he bought from Mercy.

In The New 52 (a reboot of DC universe launched in 2011), Mercy Graves is reintroduced as an Asian American. She works as Lex Luthor's personal assistant and manages LexCorp during his absence.

In other media

Television

Animated 
 Mercy Graves appears in The Batman episode "The Batman/Superman Story, Part One", voiced by Gwendoline Yeo. This version appears to be of Eurasian descent, and has a pair of twin laser guns.
 Mercy Graves appears in Young Justice. This version has a cybernetic right arm concealing powerful weapons, but does not speak. In the episode "Targets", when assassins Cheshire and Sportsmaster attempt to kill him and two Asian diplomats, Mercy stops them, and the diplomats, being grateful and impressed by her, make a deal with Luthor. In "Usual Suspects", she acts as Luthor's bodyguard during the battle at Santa Prisca. She blasts Aqualad when he attempts to arrest Luthor, and the two escape by helicopter. She reappears alongside Luthor in "Satisfaction", helping in the escape from vengeful Roy Harper who bombs his office before they find Harper inside a parking garage blowing up Luthor's car. Mercy and Roy engage in a duel across the garage, and he eventually succeeds in blowing off her cybernetic arm and knocking her into a car windshield. Later, Roy shows Green Arrow and his Cadmus clone Red Arrow a cybernetic arm more powerful than Mercy's, and declares Speedy "dead", preferring the sound of "Arsenal".
 Mercy Graves appears in the Harley Quinn episodes "Bachelorette" and "Something Borrowed, Something Green".

Live-action 
 A character loosely based on Mercy Graves appears in Smallville as Tess Mercer, who is a composite of Mercy, Eve Teschmacher and Lena Luthor, portrayed by Cassidy Freeman. Tess was nicknamed "Mercy" by Oliver Queen, and is inferred to later change their name (possibly to "Mercy Graves").
 Mercy Graves appears in The CW series Supergirl, portrayed by Rhona Mitra. This version is a former Project Cadmus agent alongside her brother Otis Graves. Similar to her Superman: The Animated Series counterpart, Mercy was also head of security for what was then known as Luthor-Corp under Lex Luthor's reign; following the latter's arrest, Mercy and Otis began to work for Cadmus before Lillian was arrested. Debuting in "American Alien", Mercy and Otis begin committing hate crimes against aliens, including the president summit. The duo's aim was to kill and expose the president Olivia Marsdin as an alien. The murder was prevented by Supergirl at the cost of public exposure showing her as Durlan. Supergirl catches Otis, but Mercy escapes. In "Fallout", Mercy is apprehended by the DEO and Supergirl following Mercy's fight with Lena Luthor at L-Corp. They persuade a DEO agent named Raymond Jensen to release them as they use Lena Luthor's lead-dispersion device to spread Kryptonite into the air which weakened Supergirl. In the episode "Ahimsa", Agent Jensen assists Mercy Graves and Otis into furthering their anti-alien goals by releasing a Hellgrammite and an unnamed Kopy from the DEO custody where they cause havoc at a carnival. After the Kryptonite in the air is gone and the Kopy is defeated, Mercy and Otis are killed by the Hellgrammite who surrendered to the DEO, though Otis survived own death.
 Mercy Graves appears in Titans, portrayed by Natalie Gumede. This version is a lesbian and mother of two daughters, as well as the former head of Cadmus.

Film

Animated 
 Mercy Graves appears in Superman: Brainiac Attacks, voiced by Tara Strong. She is seen at Lex Luthor's side, even to the part where Brainiac uses LexCorp technology to build a new body. Mercy discovers Jimmy looking for evidence against Luthor and attacks him. Eventually, Jimmy uses a robot to knock her out, though destroying his camera in the process. While Luthor is recuperating in the hospital being interviewed following Brainiac's attack, he quietly tells Mercy to call all his lawyers when a small Kryptonite shard found by detectives in his facility exposes his involvement with Brainiac's rampage.
 Mercy Graves appears in Superman: Doomsday, voiced by Cree Summer. In the film, she watches a project with Lex Luthor that involves LexCorp secretly, and illegally, digging deep underground, where they accidentally unearth the villain Doomsday. Luthor tells Mercy to make sure that all evidence of LexCorp's involvement never existed. When Doomsday and Superman kill each other in an epic battle, Luthor loses his chance to be responsible for Superman's death, both directly and indirectly through Mercy's destruction of the evidence. Once Mercy informs him that there is no link back to LexCorp, he shoots her in the head to ensure absolutely nothing can be traced back to him.
 Mercy Graves appears in The Death of Superman and Reign of the Supermen, voiced by Erica Luttrell.
 Mercy Graves made a non-speaking role in Superman: Man of Tomorrow.
 Mercy Graves appears in DC League of Super-Pets, voiced by Maya Erskine.

Live-action 
 Mercy Graves was considered as a villain in the scrapped Superman Reborn and Superman Lives film projects. Famke Janssen was considered for the role.
 Mercy Graves appears in the 2016 film Batman v Superman: Dawn of Justice, portrayed by Tao Okamoto. This version is killed in a bombing of the Capitol masterminded by Luthor during a Congressional hearing, to both discredit Superman and receive approval to use salvaged Kryptonian technology (first seen in 2013's Man of Steel) against him.

Video games 
 Mercy Graves appeared in Superman: Shadow of Apokolips, voiced by Lauren Tom.
 Mercy Graves appears in Lego DC Super-Villains, with Cree Summer reprising the role from Superman: Doomsday. She is first seen at Stryker's Island with "The Rookie" on her side to help break out Lex Luthor before answering a question from Commissioner Gordon that involves a break in at Waynetech. Following her success on freeing her employer and the Rookie, Graves is later accompanied by Cheetah and Solomon Grundy to free Metallo from beneath the prison. While the Stryker's Island breakout was a success, Graves is later seen flying with Luthor to escape the Justice League after their arrival on Stryker's, then later accidentally crashed The Joker's getaway helicopter.

References

External links 
 Mercy Graves bio on the official Superman Batman Adventures homepage
 

Characters created by Bruce Timm
Comics characters introduced in 1996
DC Animated Universe original characters
DC Comics Amazons
DC Comics characters with superhuman strength
DC Comics female superheroes
DC Comics female supervillains
Female characters in animated series
Fictional bodyguards
Fictional female businesspeople
Fictional chauffeurs
Fictional cyborgs
Fictional henchmen
Fictional LGBT characters in television
Superhero film characters
Superman characters
Fictional lesbians